Hileithia aplicalis is a moth in the family Crambidae. It was described by Achille Guenée in 1854. It is found in North America, where it has been recorded from Georgia, Arizona, Florida and Texas.

The wingspan is about 11 mm. Adults have been recorded on wing from February to August.

References

Moths described in 1854
Spilomelinae